Cadenza is the second album by the Marple band Dutch Uncles and their first album to receive a release in the UK. It was released on 25 April 2011 as an Audio CD, iTunes digital download and Gatefold vinyl. The album was recorded in Salford in Greater Manchester, England during the summer of 2010.

Track listing

 The song 'X-O' samples 'Electronic Counterpoint' by Steve Reich.

References

2011 albums
Dutch Uncles albums
Memphis Industries albums